"Living My Life" is a Grace Jones song released as a single in 1983.

Background
The track was originally recorded for the album of the same name, but for unknown reasons (most likely that the pop-oriented record did not fit the overall reggae sound of the album) it did not make the final cut. It received a scarce 1983 release as a UK white label single and was officially released only in Portugal. Jones, however, performed the track on several TV shows. A remixed version was released as the B-side to the UK reissue single of "Love Is the Drug" in 1986. The original and dub versions are yet to be reissued on CD.

Music video
The music video for the song was directed by Jean-Paul Goude and famously includes the "suicide" scene, with Grace blowing her brains out. Excerpts from the "Living My Life" video were used in the "Slave to the Rhythm" clip. The music video for "Living My Life" was also included in Jones' concert film, A One Man Show.

Track listing
12" single (1983)
A. "Living My Life" – 7:34
B. "Living My Life" (Dub) – 4:15

12" promotional single (1983)
A. "Living My Life" – 7:34
B. "Living My Life" – 7:34

References

1983 singles
Grace Jones songs
Songs written by Grace Jones
1983 songs
Song recordings produced by Alex Sadkin
Island Records singles